Jonathan Kakou (born 18 December 1989) is a footballer who plays as a defender for AS Magenta.

References 

1989 births
Living people
New Caledonian footballers
New Caledonia international footballers
Association football defenders
AS Lössi players
AS Magenta players
2008 OFC Nations Cup players
2012 OFC Nations Cup players